Azel Ames (August 16, 1845 – November 12, 1908) was an American physician, author, sanitation authority, and legislator.

He was born in Chelsea, Massachusetts, to Azel and Louisa (Lufkin) Ames, and graduated from Phillips Andover Academy. During the Civil War he served as first lieutenant in the second Louisiana engineers, United States army.

He graduated Harvard Medical School in 1871 and became a practicing physician before devoting himself to public sanitation efforts, where he was engaged to draw up the health and sanitary regulations for many large cities. He was a member of the Massachusetts State Drainage Commission and was twice sent as a representative of the United States Government to international sanitary conferences. He was longtime resident Wakefield, Massachusetts, where he founded the water company and board of health. In 1879 he was elected representative in the Massachusetts State Legislature and was secretary of the Committee on Public Health. In 1898–99 he was acting-assistant surgeon the United States army during the Spanish–American War; and in 1899 was major and brigadier surgeon in the United States volunteers. His books include The Mayflower and Its Log, Sex in Industry; Elementary Hygiene for the Tropics, and The Family of John Philips.

In 1866 he married Sarah Deering Thomas Ames, daughter of Sarah and Elijah Ames, and they had three children: Azel Jr., an official on the New York Central Railroad; Edward Winslow; a diplomat; and Louise Kimball Ames, who became a noted designer. He spent the last several years of his life as a patient at Danvers State Hospital, where he died in 1908, aged 63.

References

1845 births
1908 deaths
Physicians from Massachusetts
People from Chelsea, Massachusetts
People from Wakefield, Massachusetts
Phillips Academy alumni
Harvard Medical School alumni
Members of the Massachusetts House of Representatives
Danvers State Hospital patients